The SPL Turun piiri (Turku Football Association) is one of the 12 district organisations of the Football Association of Finland. It administers lower tier football in Turku.

Background 

Suomen Palloliiton Turun piiri, commonly referred to as SPL Turun piiri or SPL Turku, is the governing body for football in Turku.  Based in the city of Turku, the Association's Director is Jouni Koivuniemi.

Member clubs

League Competitions 

SPL Turkun piiri run the following league competitions:

Men's Football
 Division 3 - Kolmonen  -  one section
 Division 4 - Nelonen  -  one section
 Division 5 - Vitonen  -  two sections
 Division 6 - Kutonen  -  three sections

Ladies Football
 Division 3 - Kolmonen  -  one section

Footnotes

References

External links 
 SPL Turun piiri Official Website 

T